Senapati (Sanskrit: सेनापति; sena- meaning "army", -pati meaning "lord") is a title in ancient India denoting the rank of military commander or general of the army. 

It was a hereditary title of nobility used in the Maratha Empire. During wartime, a Sardar Senapati or Sarsenapati (also colloquially termed Sarnaubat) functioned as the Commander-in-Chief of all Maratha forces, coordinating the commands of the various Sardars in battle.

Ranking under the heir-apparent crown prince and other hereditary princes, the title Senapati most closely resembles a British Duke or German Herzog in rank and function. On occasion, the title Mahasenapati (Sanskrit: महा maha- meaning "great") was granted; this best equates to a Grand Duke or a German Großherzog.

Unlike Sardar, Senapati is a primogeniture hereditary title that passes on to the eldest son. There are several royal Senapati families alive today, including the Ghorpade and Dabhade families.

Outside of India
In Cambodia, the term sena padei means "military commander". It used in the title of the current Prime Minister of Cambodia, Hun Sen.

In ancient Philippines, this title was used by Sang pamegat senāpati di Tundun, the "Commander-in-chief" of Tondo represented by Jayadewa, Lord Minister of Pailah mentioned in the Laguna Copperplate Inscription circa 900 AD.

In Indonesia, the term senapati has been absorbed into Old Javanese and eventually Javanese language to refer to "general" or "army commander". In Javanese it can be rendered as Senapati or Senopati. For example, the title of Sutawijaya, the founder of 16th century Javanese Mataram Sultanate, was Senapati ing Alaga, which means "general of battle".

Examples
 Sarsenapati Yesaji Kank
 Mankoji Dahatonde
 Prataprao Gujar
 Vira Pasi Senapati of Rae Bareli
 Hambirrao Mohite
 Santaji Ghorpade, Senapati of Kolhapur
 Dhanaji Jadhavrao
 Chandrasen Jadhav
 Khanderao Dabhade, Senapati of Satara

Other people

 Senapati Bapat, (1880–1967)
 Fakir Mohan Senapati, (1843–1918)

See also
 Pradhan Senapati
 Filipino styles and honorifics
 Malay styles and titles

References

Hindi words and phrases
Military history of India
Honorifics
Men's social titles
Feudalism in Asia